Monument istoric (plural: Monumente istorice), a "historic monument", is the Romanian term of designation for national heritage sites in Romania.

Classifications
A Monument istoric is defined as: 
an architectural or sculptural work, or archaeological site. 
having significant cultural heritage value, and of immovable scale. 
perpetuating the memory of an event, place, or historical personality.

Monumente istorice cultural properties include listed Romanian historical monuments from the National Register of Historic Monuments in Romania. They may also include places that are not specifically listed in whole, but which contain listed entities, such as memorial statues and fountains in parks and cemeteries.

Inventory
There are 29,540 designated monumente istorice (historical monuments) entries listed individually in Romania, as of 2010.

Of these, 2,621 are in Bucharest; 1,630 in Iaşi County; 1,381 in Cluj County; 1,239 in Dâmboviţa County; 1,069 in Prahova County; 1,023 in Argeș County; 1,017 in Mureș County; 1,014 in Sibiu County; 983 in Braşov County; 865 in Buzău County; 833 in Caraş-Severin County; 790 in Vâlcea County; 765 in Bistriţa-Năsăud County; 758 in Olt County; 740 in Harghita County; 724 in Ilfov County; 699 in Dolj County; 684 in Constanţa County; 679 in Alba County; 588 in Covasna County; 582 in Maramureș County; 569 in Mehedinţi County; 567 in Tulcea County; 544 in Sălaj County; 542 in Giurgiu County; 537 in Neamţ County; 520 in Hunedoara County; 517 in Suceava County; 509 in Botoşani County; 501 in Gorj County; 435 in Bihor County; 434 in Vaslui County; 427 in Vrancea County; 413 in Arad County; 393 in Teleorman County; 364 in Bacău County; 338 in Timiș County; 310 in Satu Mare County; 284 in Călăraşi County; 263 in Galaţi County; 218 in Ialomiţa County; and 171 in Brăila County.

See also 
List of historic monuments in Romania
:Category:Historic monuments in Romania
Culture of Romania
Ministry of Culture and National Patrimony (Romania)

References

Lista monumentelor istorice – Primăria Municipiului Bucureşti 
Cimec.ro: Register for specialists.

External links

Monumente istorice in Romania
Map with historical monuments in Sibiu
Website of the Romanian National Institute of Historical Monuments 

 01
.
Heritage organizations
Romanian culture